The Grandiose Nowhere is the ninth studio album by Lacrimas Profundere, released on April 30, 2010.

Track listing

Bonus limited edition Digipack tracks
<li>"All Is Suffering"
<li>"Of Words and Rain"

Singles
Lips
 "Lips" - 3:52	 
 "I Don't Care" (The Downward Remix) - 3:38	 
 "A Plea" (Basement Sessions) - 3:21	 
 "Lips" (Video) - 3:55

Outtakes
 "One Hope's Evening" (Acoustic Version) - 3:38

Released Only like a Christmas gift for a limited period and posted in the Facebook of the band

2010 albums
Lacrimas Profundere albums
Napalm Records albums